Bonriki International Airport  is an international airport in Kiribati, serving as the main gateway to the country. It is located in its capital, South Tarawa, which is a group of islets in the atoll of Tarawa in the Gilbert Islands, precisely on Bonriki.

Fiji's national carrier, Fiji Airways connects Kiribati with Nadi, which is Fiji Airways' hub and Fiji's main international gateway. Nauru Airlines flies to Nauru International Airport, continuing to Honiara, the capital of Solomon Islands, and further to Brisbane, Australia. This service was suspended from July 2008 to November 2009, but later replaced by the same route with Solomon Airlines (Bonriki-Honiara-Brisbane).

The airport is the hub of the only two Kiribati airlines, flag carrier Air Kiribati and the 2009-established Coral Sun Airways, with both airlines mainly flying domestic routes within the Gilbert Islands. Air Kiribati and Coral Sun Airways both serve all 16 other airports in the Gilbert Islands, but not all these destinations are flown directly from Tarawa. Coral Sun Airways is considering buying another, larger aircraft, capable of flying to the Phoenix Islands and Line Islands.  As of 2018, only the Line Islands can be flown to, but these can only be reached by flying via Fiji.

History

The airport was built in December 1943 by United States Navy Seabees and was named "Mullinix Field", in honor of Rear Admiral Henry M. Mullinix, who died in the sinking of the USS Liscome Bay on 24 November 1943 after it was torpedoed by a Japanese submarine off the Gilbert Islands.

Almost immediately after the completion of the runway, it became the nexus of United States Army Air Forces (USAAF) operations from Tarawa, as the runway at nearby Hawkins Field on Betio was too short for safe bomber operations. The longer runway at Mullinix became the base for the VII Bomber Command Headquarters, which directed operations against Japanese forces in the Marshall Islands. In addition, the USAAF stationed the B-24 Liberator-equipped 11th Bombardment Group and B-25 Mitchell-equipped 41st Bombardment Group at the airfield.

In April 1944, the land-based units moved forward to Kwajalein Airfield in the Marshall Islands, and shortly thereafter, Mullinix was reduced to an emergency airfield. By the end of the war, the Americans abandoned the facilities and the airfield was turned into a civilian airport.

Facilities

Airlines and destinations

See also
 USAAF in the Central Pacific
Naval Base Gilbert Islands

References

External links
 Arrivals and Departures for Bonriki Airport
 
 

Airports in Kiribati
South Tarawa
Airfields of the United States Army Air Forces in the Pacific Ocean theatre of World War II
Airfields of the United States Army Air Forces Air Transport Command in the Pacific Ocean Theater
Airports established in 1943
1943 establishments in Oceania